Ordinaire is a wine bar, wine shop, and bistro-style restaurant in Oakland, California. Located on Grand Avenue in the Grand Lake District, Ordinaire had its grand opening in September 2013. Ordinaire only sells natural wine, produced from organic grapes with minimal chemical and technological intervention. Owner Bradford Taylor opened Ordinaire while pursuing a Ph.D at the University of California, Berkeley with a dissertation on the sense of taste in early 20th century modernist literature. Taylor is also an organizer of an annual natural wine festival in Oakland called Brumaire, which has held events at Ordinaire.

In addition to selling and serving wine, Ordinaire serves small plates and periodically partners with chefs to open as a pop-up restaurant called Bistro Ordinaire. Food and wine critics have praised Ordinaire for its selection of wines and hip yet unpretentious atmosphere. Amid a wave of interest in natural wine in the United States, Ordinaire has helped to establish Oakland as a natural wine hub. The shop has been described as an important site for natural wine culture within the East Bay, the San Francisco Bay Area, the West Coast, and the United States as a whole.

Ordinaire and natural wine
Ordinaire exclusively stocks and sells natural wine. Owner Bradford Taylor modeled Ordinaire after the caves à manger—small natural wine shops that serve food—he encountered while living in Paris, particularly Le Verre Volé, Le Chateaubriand, and Le Baratin. "Natural wine" does not have a precise formal or legal definition; however, the term is generally accepted to mean wine produced from organically farmed or biodynamic grapes, without the use (or at least, minimal use) of filtration or additives (except for preservative sulfites, which are still often avoided). Taylor has said "there's something productive about how nebulous the term 'natural' is, how it opens itself up to debate every time it comes up," and:

Ordinaire has helped to promote natural wine in the Bay Area and the United States generally, and has become an Oakland destination for tourists. Chaney Kwak of The Guardian cited Ordinaire in an article arguing that Oakland was becoming a "New Brooklyn" and a "creative capital to rival" San Francisco. According to Jordan Michelman at Sprudge, there is "no one true home for natural wine in America ... But there are certain addresses that help define the culture here, and among them there's none more important on the west coast than that of Oakland's Ordinaire. ... [Taylor's] vision and influence at the helm of Ordinaire has helped define natural wine in America." Taylor has called the Bay Area natural wine scene "really nascent, in its early stages especially compared to New York or Paris," but has also said that Ordinaire's proximity to other natural wine bars has "made Oakland an organic- and natural-wine destination for people around the United States and overseas." Luke Tsai of the East Bay Express said Taylor was "doing God's work in helping dispense with the notion that wine shops are all stuffy, intimidating places frequented only by the rich."

History

Taylor opened Ordinaire while he was a doctoral candidate at UC Berkeley, writing his dissertation on the sense of taste in modernist literature, or specifically, on "the concept of taste in early 20th century literature, as it toggles between an aesthetic sensibility and a more gustatory, more physical sense of eating." Taylor and his wife Nicole Betenia rented the building, a 3,000-sq ft former gym, and began renovations in October 2012. The shop was originally going to be named The Red Whale, but was renamed shortly before opening when Taylor received a cease-and-desist letter from a coffee business with the same name. The name Ordinaire was chosen after the French term vin ordinaire, which refers to everyday, "ordinary" wines that skip bottling to be served by winemakers among their friends, typically in a bistro setting.

Ordinaire had a soft opening in August 2013 and its grand opening in September. The shop is located on Grand Avenue in the Grand Lake District, a neighborhood of Oakland located at the northwest corner of Lake Merritt. Taylor chose the location because it was less expensive than many of the city's other, better-established commercial districts; he also said he "thought it was ridiculous that this part of Oakland didn't have a shop that was an alternative to Trader Joe's and Whole Foods."

At the time Ordinaire opened, Taylor said that he and the staff "didn't know what the fuck we were doing" and that there was "a sum total of zero days of service experience between the entire staff." At the time of opening, Taylor said, most patrons were unfamiliar with natural wine, and so the store sold "a bunch of conventional stuff just to subsidize the kinds of wines we wanted to drink." By 2017, Ordinaire carried about 400 bottles in its cellar and, according to Taylor, had become "a producer-centered shop, so we try to buy as many cuvées as we can from each winemaker we support"—something wine writer Pamela S. Busch said shows "a certain level of support and loyalty on the buyer's part," but "also requires the consumer to actively participate and think about what they are drinking." As of 2017, Taylor was living in Chicago and working to open a new shop with tastings but no bar component, which "won't be called Ordinaire. There's only one of those." Taylor later announced that the Chicago shop will be called Diversey Wine. Since Taylor's departure to Chicago, Ordinaire has been managed by Quentin Jeanroy, with help from Alex Leopold, Kara Fowler, and Diego Perez.

Brumaire Natural Wine Festival
Along with Josh Eubank (Percy Selections), Quinn Kimsey-White (Psychic Wines), and Matt Coelho (Woods Beer), Taylor helps organize the Brumaire Natural Wine Festival, an annual Oakland-based natural wine festival that began in 2016. Brumaire was inspired by wine-tasting salons and festivals in Europe and has featured wines from California, France, Italy, and Spain. Events at Brumaire have been hosted at Ordinaire itself, with other events hosted at nearby bars and restaurants. By its third year in 2018, Brumaire hosted 51 wineries and 500 attendants, with 400 people on a wait list.

Food and Bistro Ordinaire
Ordinaire serves small sides for wine and food matching like cheese, charcuterie, and sardines. Ordinaire periodically opens as a pop-up restaurant called Bistro Ordinaire. The first Bistro Ordinaire pop-up opened in 2014 under the direction of Chris Kronner, who was in the process of moving his burger restaurant KronnerBurger from San Francisco to Oakland. Rather than his signature burger, Kronner served French cuisine and other fare. Kronner's Bistro Ordinaire won acclaim from Zagat, the East Bay Express, and Oakland magazine, whose Ethan Fletcher said that Kronner "caused a minor riot among Oakland foodies." Bistro Ordinaire returned in 2017 with Kosuke Tada, a chef Taylor met in Paris, serving three-course, prix fixe French-style meals. Ordinaire partnered with the Oakland restaurant Camino for an annual lunch event called Piqnique Ordinaire.

For several years, Ordinaire partnered with the nearby pizzeria Boot & Shoe Service to serve pizza at the bar. In January 2018, Ordinaire discontinued the partnership after Boot & Shoe's owner, Charlie Hallowell, was accused of sexual harassment by 17 former employees. In an announcement on Facebook, Taylor wrote "[c]hange will only come if corporate officers and investors are economically threatened and the current modes of production are broken. ... Remember that the food and wine community that we cherish and enjoy is not built out of abstract ideas. It is built out of humans." Janelle Bitker of the East Bay Express noted the moral quandary facing restaurant patrons, who may fear that boycotting a business reported for sexual harassment could harm employees more than abusive owners; according to Bitker, Ordinaire had taken "a significant stand that boycotting — as customers, suppliers, and business partners — is the answer."

Reception
Within a year of its grand opening, Ordinaire received positive reviews in Eater San Francisco, San Jose Mercury News, SF Weekly, Oakland Local, Wine & Spirits, The San Francisco Examiner, and Saveur. In December 2013, Eater named Ordinaire one of the 19 "hottest" wine bars to open in the United States (plus one in Montreal) in the preceding year. Ordinaire has been listed as one of the best wine bars in the United States by Thrillist (in 2014), Bon Appétit (in 2015), and Food & Wine (in 2017). In 2018, Esquire named Ordinaire one of the 21 best bars in the United States.

Jordan Michelman wrote in the wine blog Sprudge:

Local news site Berkeleyside recommended Ordinaire as a natural wine merchant, noting "[y]es, it has a young and hipster-y vibe, but there's zero snobbery," and called it "one of our country's greatest wine bars." Pamela S. Busch wrote for The San Francisco Examiner that Ordinaire was worth visiting from San Francisco: "I'd come back here even if it was a hole-in-the-wall — but it is not. Ordinaire is sophisticated without being pretentious, and this carries over to the ambiance. I wish it was closer to, if not in, San Francisco, but I get that Oakland needs to have wine bars of this caliber as well. No matter where you live in the Bay Area, Ordinaire is worth the trip." Saveur editor Chris Cohen praised the selection, atmosphere, and affordability, writing "I usually dislike drinking wine out—something about seeing a wine listed for triple what I would pay in a store rubs me the wrong way. Ordinaire does things much more civilly: they're also a retail operation, and for $10 corkage they'll open anything in the shop for on-premises consumption." Esther Mobley at the San Francisco Chronicle wrote that domestic and foreign natural wines were well-represented in Ordinaire's selection, but "[i]f it all sounds too crunchy-granola for you, there's also excellent normal-tasting wine here: Cabernet from Corison; Champagne from Bérèche et Fils and Laherte Freres champagne." Adding that Ordinaire had "great" wines at a variety of price points, Mobley continued: "In the spirit of La Verre Volé, Ordinaire is spare, unpolished, even a little disheveled: Open boxes lie along the walls; magazines are piled on the bench of a wooden piano. It's relaxing, like you're in someone's living room. Pours are not stingy, and unsolicited top-offs are not uncommon."

Marissa A. Ross, the wine columnist for Bon Appétit, is an avowed fan of Ordinaire. In her 2017 book Wine. All the Time.: The Casual Guide to Confident Drinking, Ross wrote "I trust my favorite wine shops so much you would assume I was of blood relation to their owners. Places like Domaine LA, Lou, or Ordinaire know me better than I know myself." In an article on natural wine for Bon Appétit co-written by Ross and Belle Cushing, the two opined: "A natural wine bar—whether it's Ordinaire in Oakland or Sub Rosato in Richmond, VA—is a modern version of Cheers, with hand-harvested pinots instead of pints. And even if no one knows your name (yet), you might recognize some labels on the wall—a sign that you're among friends."

See also

Natural wine
Organic wine
Biodynamic wine
California wine
The Alley — a piano bar on Grand Avenue across the street from Ordinaire

References

External links
 OrdinaireWine.com – official website
 
 "Introducing Ordinaire" – an article by owner Bradford Taylor for the UC Berkeley English Department at the time of Ordinaire's opening, via the Internet Archive

Wine bars
California wine
Drinking establishments in the San Francisco Bay Area
Restaurants in the San Francisco Bay Area
Culture of Oakland, California
Tourist attractions in Oakland, California
2013 establishments in California
Restaurants established in 2013
Organic food